Ottumwa is an unincorporated community in Coffey County, Kansas, United States.

History
A post office was established in Ottumwa in 1857, and remained in operation until it was discontinued in 1906.

References

Further reading

External links
 Coffey County maps: Current, Historic, KDOT

Unincorporated communities in Coffey County, Kansas
Unincorporated communities in Kansas
1857 establishments in Kansas Territory